Trevor Hill, 1st Viscount Hillsborough (1693 – 5 May 1742) was an Anglo-Irish landowner and politician who sat in the Irish House of Commons from 1713 to 1715 and in the British House of Commons from 1715 to 1722.

Hill was the eldest son of Michael Hill of Hillsborough and his wife Anne Trevor, daughter of Sir John Trevor, MP of Brynkinalt, Denbighshire. He was a member of an influential landowning family of County Down, Ireland. His father died in 1699 and Hill succeeded to his estates.  He married sometime before 1717, Mary Denton, widow of Sir Edmund Denton, 1st Baronet of Hillesden and daughter of Anthony Rowe, of Muswell Hill, Middlesex.

Hill represented Hillsborough in the Irish House of Commons from 1713 to 1715 and subsequently Down from 1715 until 1717, when he was raised to the Peerage of Ireland as Baron Hill of Kilwarlin, in the County of Down, and Viscount Hillsborough. He became an Irish Privy Councilloer on 20 September 1717.

At the 1715 British general election he stood unsuccessfully as a Whig for Saltash, but three months later was returned as Member of Parliament for Aylesbury at a by-election on 30 April 1715. In 1722 his friend, the Duke of Wharton returned him as MP for Malmesbury, but he was unseated on petition on 13 December 1722. He was defeated at a by-election at Appleby in 1723, and did not stand for Parliament again. He was appointed Governor of County Down in 1729.

Hill had charm but a poor reputation as a wanton and profligate. He tried to recuperate his debts by gambling on horses, and was one of a party of men that were given a whipping by a carter offended by their riding naked with young ladies around Buckinghamshire.

Lord Hillsborough died aged 48 in May 1742. He had four sons and two daughters and was succeeded in the titles by his son Wills, who became a prominent statesman.  His brother Arthur Hill succeeded to the Trevor estates through their mother and was created Baron Hill and Viscount Dungannon in 1765.

References

1693 births
1742 deaths
17th-century Irish people
Irish MPs 1713–1714
Irish MPs 1715–1727
Members of the Parliament of Great Britain for English constituencies
Members of the Parliament of Ireland (pre-1801) for County Down constituencies
Hillsborough
British MPs 1715–1722
British MPs 1722–1727
Members of the Privy Council of Ireland
Trevor
People from County Down
Viscounts Hillsborough
Irish emigrants to Great Britain